Aglaia heterotricha is a species of plant in the family Meliaceae. It is endemic to Tonga an island in the South Pacific.

References

heterotricha
Endemic flora of Tonga
Critically endangered flora of Oceania
Taxonomy articles created by Polbot